EBIX, the European forum for energy Business Information eXchange, is a non-profit European organisation with the avowed objectives to advance, develop and standardise the use of electronic information exchange in the European energy industry. ebIX was founded in 2003 as a European organisation continuing the previous work of Ediel Nordic Forum. The main focus is interchange of administrative data for the internal European energy markets for electricity and gas. The members of ebIX, per August 2009, are UMIX (Belgium), Swissgrid (Switzerland), BDEW (Germany), Energinet.dk (Denmark), TenneT (Netherlands), Statnett (Norway) and Svenska Kraftnät (Sweden). In addition ebIX has observers from Transmission System Operators and national associations of Electricity distribution operators from several other European countries. The ebIX framework is used by all electricity suppliers and electricity distribution operators in the participating countries.

References and footnotes

External links
European forum for energy Business Information eXchange(ebIX)

T